is a town located in Hakui District, Ishikawa Prefecture, Japan. , the town had an estimated population of 20,845 in 8090 households, and a population density of 84 persons per km2.

Geography
Shika occupies the southwestern coastline of Noto Peninsula, facing the Sea of Japan on the west. It is one and a half hours from Kanazawa by car. Shika has a humid continental climate (Köppen Cfa) characterized by mild summers and cold winters with heavy snowfall.  The average annual temperature in Shika is 13.3 °C. The average annual rainfall is 2405 mm with September as the wettest month. The temperatures are highest on average in August, at around 25.7 °C, and lowest in January, at around 2.5 °C.

Part of the town is within the limits of the Noto Hantō Quasi-National Park.

Neighbouring municipalities
Ishikawa Prefecture
Nanao
Wajima
Hakui
Anamizu
Nakanoto

Climate

Demographics
Per Japanese census data, the population of Shika has declined over the past 50 years.

History
The area around Shika was part of ancient Noto Province. During the Sengoku Period (1467–1568), the area was contested between the Hatakeyama clan, Uesugi clan and Maeda clan, with the area becoming part of Kaga Domain under the Edo period Tokugawa shogunate.  Following the Meiji restoration, the area was organised into Hakui District, Ishikawa, and the  village of Shika was established with the creation of the modern municipalities system on April 1, 1889. Shika was raised to town status on February 1, 1936. On September 1, 2005, the former town of Togi was annexed by Shika.

On January 9, 2015 a resident reported a wooden boat to the local police, which was washed up on the shore. Due to Hangul characters on the boat it was suspected to be from North Korea. The police arrested one man on the boat, who claimed he had left North Korea unintended in mid-December 2014 when conducting an inspection of the boat.

Economy
Once a centre for the garment manufacturing industry, the local economy is now dominated by the presence of the Shika Nuclear Power Plant operated by Hokuriku Electric Power Company. Commercial fishing and agriculture are also important to the local economy.

Education
Shika has two public elementary schools and two public middle schools operated by the town government, and one public high school operated by the Ishikawa Prefectural Board of Education.

Transportation

Railway
The town has no passenger railway service since the closure of the Hokuriku Railway's Noto Line on June 25, 1972.

Highway

Sister city relations
 - Karawang Regency, West Java, Indonesia, friendship city since January 25, 1999
 - Colwood, British Columbia, Canada, friendship city since May 11, 1999

Local attractions
Fukura Lighthouse, built in 1867, the oldest wooden lighthouse in Japan
Mount Takatsume
Noto Kongo coastline

Notes

External links

   (some English content)

 
Towns in Ishikawa Prefecture
Populated coastal places in Japan